Alberto Tronco (born 22 May 1997) is an Italian professional footballer who plays as a forward for Folgore Caratese.

References

External links 
 
 

Living people
1997 births
People from Cittadella
Italian footballers
Association football forwards
Serie C players
ACF Fiorentina players
Hellas Verona F.C. players
Bassano Virtus 55 S.T. players
L.R. Vicenza players
U.S. Folgore Caratese A.S.D. players
Sportspeople from the Province of Padua
Footballers from Veneto